Saint Constantine may refer to:

 Constantine I (c. 272 – 337), Roman Emperor and a convert to Christianity
 Constantine of Dumnonia (6th century), King of Cornwall
 Constantine of Strathclyde (6th century), probably fictitious King of Strathclyde
 Constantine (British saint), various figures of this name
 Constantine the Jew (fl. c.850–886), Byzantine monk
 Constantine XI, last Byzantine emperor, unofficial Catholic Saint
 St Cyril, born Constantine, Christian theologian from Thessalonica and Christian missionary among the Slavs with his brother Methodius